Estonian School of Diplomacy is a private university in Tallinn, Estonia, established in 1990. It is located in the building of the National Library of Estonia.

See also
List of universities in Estonia

References

External links

Universities and colleges in Estonia
Educational institutions established in 1990
Education in Tallinn
1990 establishments in Estonia